OpenSCE (Open Scalable Cluster Environment) is an Open-source beowulf-clustering software suite led by Kasetsart University, Thailand. It started from a small system monitoring for cluster, called SCMS (Scalable Cluster Monitoring System) and extend from its base to many sub-project. Currently OpenSCE has the following components

Components
 SCEBase - Core system library and command line
 SCMS (Scalable Cluster Monitoring System) - Cluster monitoring. Including some command line tools for cluster management
 SCMSWeb - Grid & Cluster web-base monitoring system
 MPITH - A thin layer of MPI that focus on light & robust implementation
 MPView - A visual profiling and debugger for parallel program
 OpenSCE Roll - A bundled of components to install in a NPACI Rocks cluster distribution.

Currently, OpenSCE project has been moved into umbrella of Thai National Grid Project, led by Thai National Grid Center.

Some components of OpenSCE, especially SCMSWeb, has been used to monitor many Grid computing researches. Such as PRAGMA, APGrid, and also Thai National Grid.

External links

 OpenSCE Project
 Thai National Grid Project

Internet Protocol based network software
Parallel computing
Grid computing